Wandee Singwancha or Wandee Chor Chareon (born On Doowiset (อ้อน ดูวิเศษ) on February 5, 1980 in Nong Han District, Udon Thani Province, Thailand) is a professional boxer in the light flyweight (108 lb) division. His record is 67-17-1 (18 KOs). He is a former WBC Minimumweight and WBC interim light-flyweight champion. 

He is the nephew of Wanwin Chor Charoen, a former challenger for WBF Mini flyweight world champion at Samutprakarn Crocodile Farm and Zoo, Samutprakarn Province in 1994 (Wanwin is a uncle).

He won the Minimumweight world title for the vacant championship by defeating the Tokyo-based Taiwanese boxer Rocky Lin at Yokohama Arena, Yokohama, Japan in mid-1998.

See also 
List of Mini-flyweight boxing champions

External links 
 

|-

|-
 

light flyweight
|-

   

1980 births
Living people
World Boxing Council champions
Mini-flyweight boxers
World mini-flyweight boxing champions
World light-flyweight boxing champions
Wandee Singwangcha
Wandee Singwangcha